Beasts of Asia is an internationally co-produced children's and youth drama by EBS. The series features different myths from 12 Asian countries that have been reinterpreted in a contemporary way. Its first season aired on EBS 1TV every Sunday with five episodes from June 20 to July 18, 2021, starring An Jin-hyeon, Jang Mun-ik, and Lee Kyoung-yoon.

Its second season, Beasts of Asia 2, was broadcast on EBS 1TV from October 5 to October 19, 2022, every Wednesday to Friday. Kim Min-seo, from the first episode of the previous season, now lead the narration of the seven stories.

Series overview

Synopsis 
Beasts of Asia follows the story of the myths of 12 Asian countries, with a focus on Story Hunters - Sol, Min, Teo, and Eun-ho. Story Hunters are a small group of races with memories before the souls of humans and animals split. They seek out stories of people who have seen or benefited from talking beasts through "Cocoon", an online hub for Asian youth.

Cast

Main

Season 1 
 An Jin-hyeon as Sol

 Sol is the leader of Story Hunters. She is a direct descendant of Dangun and has the soul of a bear.

 Jang Mun-ik as Min

 Min is the group's visual manager and an aspiring idol. His soul is feline and has quirky charms.

 Lee Kyoung-yoon as Teo

 Teo is the brain of the group and has the soul of an owl. He is an animator and creates webtoon in Cocoon.

Season 2 
Kim Min-seo as Eun-ho

 Eun-ho is a next generation Story Hunter and an exemplary archer with a soul of a bear.

Episodes

Season 1 
The first season introduced myths from five Asian countries, including Korea, India, Mongolia, Bhutan, and Vietnam.

Season 2 
The second season featured myths from seven countries, including Thailand, Laos, Cambodia, Indonesia, Malaysia, the Philippines, and Myanmar, completing the myth stories from 12 Asian countries.

Awards and nominations

References

External links 

  

2021 South Korean television series debuts
Korean-language television shows
Children's television series by genre
South Korean children's television shows
Asian mythology